Llata is a town in central Peru, capital of Huamalíes Province in Huánuco Region.

References

External links

Populated places in the Huánuco Region